Mi-parti is an orchestral work by the Polish composer Witold Lutosławski, composed from 1975 to 1976 on a commission from the City of Amsterdam for the Concertgebouw Orchestra. The name broadly means in two equal but different parts, referring to the treatment of the material rather than the large-scale structure of the piece.

The first performance took place on 22 October 1976 in Rotterdam, with the composer conducting the Concertgebouw Orchestra.

Instrumentation
The work calls for a large orchestra made up as follows:
woodwind:  3 flutes (all doubling piccolo), 3 oboes, 3 clarinets (3rd doubling bass clarinet), 3 bassoons
brass: 3 trumpets in C, 4 horns, 3 trombones, 1 tuba
percussion: timpani, 3 percussionists (bells, marimba, xylophone, glockenspiel, tam-tams,  cymbals, vibraphone without motor)
celesta, harp, piano
and strings (8 first violins, 7 second violins, 6 violas, 6 cellos and 4 basses).

Recordings

Awards:
 for EMI recording: International Critics’ Award, 1979; Deutsche Schallplattenpreis 1977
 for the piece: State Prize, 1st grade 1978

References

Compositions by Witold Lutosławski
1976 compositions
Compositions for symphony orchestra
Commissioned music